Captain Henry Gordon Clappison (October 1, 1898 – May 15, 1977) was a World War I flying ace credited with six aerial victories.

Clappison's run of victories came late in World War I. He was assigned to 204 Squadron in August 1918 to pilot a Sopwith Camel. He set afire a Fokker D.VII on 20 September 1918 and ran up five more wins over D.VIIs by November 1. His final tally was two destroyed, four driven down out of control.

Sources of information

References
Above the Trenches: a Complete Record of the Fighter Aces and Units of the British Empire Air Forces 1915-1920. Christopher F. Shores, Norman L. R. Franks, Russell Guest. Grub Street, 1990. , .

1898 births
1977 deaths
Canadian World War I flying aces
People from Hamilton, Ontario
Recipients of the Croix de guerre (Belgium)
Royal Naval Air Service aviators